Forrest Merrill (born August 15, 1996) is an American football defensive end for the Los Angeles Chargers of the National Football League (NFL). He played college football for Arkansas State.

Professional career

Merrill was signed by the Los Angeles Chargers as an undrafted free agent on May 1, 2021. He made the initial 53-man roster, but was waived on September 1, 2021, and then re-signed to the team's practice squad. Merrill was promoted to the Chargers' active roster on October 4, 2021. He was waived on October 30 and re-signed to the practice squad. He signed a reserve/future contract with the Chargers on January 11, 2022.

On August 15, 2022, Merrill was waived/injured by the Chargers.

References

External links
 Arkansas State Red Wolves bio
 Los Angeles Chargers bio

1996 births
Living people
Players of American football from Missouri
American football defensive tackles
Missouri State Bears football players
Northeastern Oklahoma A&M Golden Norsemen football players
Arkansas State Red Wolves football players
Los Angeles Chargers players